The Nohra concentration camp was the first of the early Nazi concentration camps in Germany, established 3 March 1933 in a school in Nohra. In the few months of its existence, it was administered by the interior ministry of Thuringia and used exclusively to imprison communists.

Background 
The Nazi party had been part of the Thuringia state government since 1930, when Wilhelm Frick was appointed interior minister. In the 1932 state elections, the Nazis won a plurality of the votes and formed a coalition government under Fritz Sauckel, who also served as interior minister. In February 1933, a Thuringian  was formed, an auxiliary police unit under Sauckel that consisted of SA, SS, and Stahlhelm members. After the 27 February 1933 Reichstag fire, hundreds of communists were arrested. To reduce overcrowding in the prisons, the interior ministry of Thuringia decided to open additional camps, called assembly camps, and the first such camp was opened on 3 March 1933 in Nohra, close to Weimar. One of the first to be taken into "protective custody" at Nohra was the communist member of the Thuringia state parliament, Fritz Gäbler.

Site 
The school buildings were located on the former Nohra airfield (close enough to the later Buchenwald concentration camp that the bell tower of the latter is visible from the site) and consisted of two buildings that were connected by one long low-rise building. The camp was located on the second floor of one of the buildings, and divided into three large rooms, furnished only with straw and blankets. There were no fences or barbed wire.

The building was demolished in the early 1950s.

Administration and guards 
Unlike most other concentration camps, Nohra was not administered by the SA or SS, but by the Thuringia interior ministry. As there were not enough policemen to guard the camp, Heimatschule students were employed as additional guards. A police station was set up in the school building where newcomers were interrogated. The commander of the station lived in a villa close by, still called  locally that was used as a Gasthaus as of 2003.

Prisoners and camp life 
All prisoners of Nohra were Thuringian communists, including half of the Communist party group in the Thuringian state parliament. The prisoners did not work, but spent the entire day in the halls where they slept, with only interrogations and new arrivals interrupting the monotony. Hygiene conditions were very poor, especially as the camp was sometimes very crowded. Occupancy averaged at 95, with a maximum of 220. In total, about 250 prisoners were interned at Nohra until the camp was closed.

The Nohra inmates were allowed to vote in the March 1933 German federal election, and their presence caused a significant rise in the communist vote in Nohra (172 in March 1933 versus 10 in the December 1932 local elections).

Known prisoners include:
 (1896-1950)
 (1898-1971)
Fritz Gäbler (1897-1974)
Werner Klinz (1901-1969)
Fritz Koch (?-1933), died on 17 March 1933 from an infection caught at the camp, the only death related to Nohra concentration camp
 (1902-1980)
 (1908-1943)
 (1896-1986)

Closure and legacy 
Nohra was among the first concentration camps that were closed down again. The closing date has been reported to be 12 April 1933, 10 May 1933, or July 1933. Remaining prisoners were moved to a prison in Ichtershausen.

In 1988, the Weimar district Socialist Unity Party of Germany ordered the installation of a memorial plaque for the concentration camp in Nohra. After German reunification, the plaque was moved to the town hall attic in 1990, and there was no local indication of the existence of the camp in the early 2000s. In the 2010s, a local history club was working on having memorial boards installed.

References

Footnotes

Bibliography

Nazi concentration camps in Germany
Buildings and structures in Weimarer Land